Juan José Imhoff (born 11 May 1988 in Rosario) is an Argentine rugby union footballer. He plays as a wing and fullback.

Club career
He played for Duendes Rugby Club, from 2009 to 2011, in the Nacional de Clubes, which he won twice, in 2009 and 2011. He moved afterwards to Racing 92 in the French Top 14, where he has played since 2011/12.

He was part of the Pampas XV at the 2011 Vodacom Cup in South Africa, winning this tournament.

International career
He also played for Argentina Jaguars. He has 35 caps for Argentina, since his first game at the 89-6 win over Chile, at 20 May 2009, for the South American Rugby Championship, in Montevideo, Uruguay, where he scored 4 tries. He was also part of the Argentine squad at the 2011 Rugby World Cup, playing in four games, three as a substitute, and scoring 2 tries, 10 points on aggregate. Imhoff has been a member of the Argentina squad that competed in the Rugby Championship in 2012, 2013, 2014 and 2015. Imhoff played at the 2015 Rugby Championship, where Argentina reached the 3rd place, scoring 3 tries in the historical first ever win over South Africa by 37-25, in Durban. This historical feat made him one of the two top try scorers of the tournament with 3 tries and 15 points. Imhoff has currently 21 tries scored for his national team, in an aggregate of 105 points.

He competed at the 2015 Rugby World Cup scoring 3 tries. Imhoff was also part of Argentina's Olympic sevens team for the 2016 Summer Olympics. Imhoff returned to the Pumas for their first victory against the All Blacks of New Zealand, as part of the Tri Nations Series on November 14, 2020.

Honours
 Racing 92
Top 14: 2015–16

References

External links
 
 2011 Rugby World Cup Profile
 

1988 births
Living people
Argentine rugby union players
Rugby union wings
Rugby union fullbacks
Argentina international rugby sevens players
Argentina international rugby union players
Duendes Rugby Club players
Racing 92 players
Pampas XV players
Argentine people of Swiss descent
Argentine people of German descent
Argentine expatriate rugby union players
Argentine expatriate sportspeople in France
Expatriate rugby union players in France
Sportspeople from Rosario, Santa Fe
Rugby sevens players at the 2016 Summer Olympics
Olympic rugby sevens players of Argentina